Vilamal Pathanchali Manoharar Temple
( ) is a Hindu temple located at Vilamal in Tiruvarur district, Tamil Nadu, India.
The temple is dedicated to Shiva, as the moolavar presiding deity, in his manifestation as Pathanchali Manoharar. His consort, Parvati, is known as Yazhinum Menmozhiyaal.

Significance 
It is one of the shrines of the 275 Paadal Petra Sthalams - Shiva Sthalams glorified in the early medieval Tevaram poems by Tamil Saivite Nayanar Tirugnanasambandar.

Literary mention 
Tirugnanasambandar describes the feature of the deity as:

References

External links 
 
 

Shiva temples in Tiruvarur district
Padal Petra Stalam